The Slovak Cuvac is a Slovak breed of dog, bred for use as a livestock guard dog. This breed—also known as Slovensky Cuvac, Slovak Chuvach, Tatransky Cuvac and Slovensky Kuvac—is closely related to the Hungarian Kuvasz. The alternate German and English spelling Tchouvatch reflects the pronunciation: chew-votch( čuvati - in serbocroatian language  - guarding) . The breed is recognised under sponsorship from Slovakia by the Fédération Cynologique Internationale with the name Slovenský čuvač. Despite the multiple renderings in English, these refer to only one breed. The United Kennel Club in the US uses the English version of the name Slovak Cuvac.

History
A good watchdog, guard, shepherd and companion, the dog proved itself also in watching cattle, turkeys, and other domestic animals – as well as its master's household. Holiday makers and visitors to the mountains and spas took to this breed and began to carry it to the lowlands. The Slovensky Cuvac is used on sheep farms and mountain ridges as well as homes and frontiers. He is boundlessly loyal and stout hearted. He resists every enemy – bears and wolves included. According to the time honored shepherd's tradition, he is always bred in white to be discernible from the beasts of the night.

This breed has been well documented as far back as the 17th century. However, as wolves slowly began to disappear from European mountains and modern herding practices were instituted, the Cuvac was faced with the prospect of being seen as a relic of the past. What few specimens were left in the 1950s were bred carelessly. Credit for reviving the breed and fixing characteristics is due Dr. Antonin Hruza, in cooperation with the veterinary school of Brno.

The registered breeding of the Slovensky Cuvac was established in Czechoslovakia by Professor Antonin Hruza from the Veterinary Faculty in Brno on June 4, 1929. The Club of the Breeders of Slovak Cuvac was established in 1933 and a written standard was established and approved in 1964 Dr. V. Kurz). The basic breeding material came from the vicinity of Liptovska Luzna, Kokava and Vychodna as well as from Rachov in the Carpathians.

Description
The body of Slovak Cuvac is slightly longer than higher. Strong and straight ridge goes – way to lower back – a little bit sloped. Strong square butt is slightly sloped, too. The low-placed tail is worn hanging, reaching hock joints. Chest reaching to elbow joint and chest's width can compared to circa one quarter of scapula's height. Ribs are well rounded and achieving long back. Belly and flanks are slightly pulled. Long scapulas are slant laid. The Slovak Cuvac has straight legs placed vertically to his body and well angled. The front paws are compact, rounded. The back paws are a little bit longer. The neck is as long as head.

The wide and elongated skull is a little bit arched, but the top of the head is flat. With side view are straight line of top of the head and straight line of nose's ridge parallel. The stop is well apparent. The supra-orbital arcs are marked, the frontal groove is flat. The wide and heavy mouth is slightly narrowed to top of the nose and is a little bit shorter than the skull. The lips fit tightly. The ears are placed high, reclined and fitted tightly to the head. The ear points are rounded. The eyes are oval shaped with caps fitting closely, straight placed at the head. The Cuvac has scissors occlusion.

The fur is dense and rich, centre parting at the ridge is not allowed. Covering hair, which is constituted by hair with 5–15 cm length, completely covers the shorter, dense and soft undercoat. Male dogs have collar around the neck. The fur is pure white. A yellowish tinge by ears is permissible, but not desirable. The eyes are brown. Muzzle, lips edges and eyelids, like the paw pads, are black.

Appearance
The breed is an animal of imposing stature. It has a large head, half of which is taken up by the nasal canal. It has strong jaws, with a scissors bite. The oval-shaped eyes are dark and lively. The ears are long and hanging while carried on the sides of the head. The tail is thickly furred, and it hangs down when the dog is at rest.

Height and weight
The weight for males ranges 77 - 99 pounds and the weight for females is 66 - 88 pounds.

Temperament
The dog is known for its hardy constitution, sturdy frame and shaggy white coat. Its frame is massive, and his temperament is naturally lively, watchful, undaunted and alert. These dogs thrive best in an environment of a large family, children and livestock to care for. Farms and ranches make the best homes. These dogs are natural guard dogs. They are gentle and loyal with their family and possessions.

Care
Regular grooming keeps the white coat clean and attractive, and furniture free of white "mohair". The annual shed of dense underwool requires vigorous brushing and bathing sessions in the Spring.

See also
 Dogs portal
 List of dog breeds

References

Simon and Schuster's Guide to Dogs

External links

FCI breeds
Dog breeds originating in Slovakia
Livestock guardian dogs